Khairunisa Mughal is a Pakistani politician who had been a Member of the Provincial Assembly of Sindh, from June 2013 to May 2018.

Early life and education
She was born on 14 June 1968 in Mirpur Khas.

She earned the degree of Bachelor of Arts and the degree of Master of Public Administration, both from the University of Sindh.

Political career

She was elected to the Provincial Assembly of Sindh as a candidate of Pakistan Peoples Party on a reserved seat for women in 2013 Pakistani general election.

References

Living people
Sindh MPAs 2013–2018
1968 births
Pakistan People's Party politicians